The Uganda nothobranch (Nothobranchius ugandensis) is a species of killifish in the family Nothobranchiidae. It is found in Kenya and Uganda, also possibly in Tanzania. Its natural habitat is intermittent freshwater marshes.

References

Uganda nothobranch
Taxonomy articles created by Polbot
Fish described in 1994